Boylife is the debut album by Lo-Fi-Fnk, released on July 24, 2006. According to the band this is "An eleven track story about being young for too long." "Reminds you a bit of that feeling you got when you heard Daft Punk for the first time. Disco without a thought of a tomorrow..."

Track listing

References

External links

2006 debut albums
Lo-Fi-Fnk albums
Moshi Moshi Records albums